The W.W. Morris House is a historic house in South Fulton, Tennessee, U.S.. It was built in 1885 for Walter W. Morris, a banker and landowner. Morris served as the mayor of South Fulton in 1917. The house was inherited by his son, Thomas. It has been listed on the National Register of Historic Places since January 27, 1983.

References

National Register of Historic Places in Obion County, Tennessee
Houses completed in 1885